Bayli Alexander Spencer-Adams (born 26 June 2001) is a professional footballer who plays as a defender for Leicester City, in their under-23 side. Born in England, he represents the Guyana national team.

Career

Watford
On 4 January 2020, Spencer-Adams made his professional debut for Watford in a 3–3 FA Cup third round draw against Tranmere Rovers.

Dover Athletic (loan)
On 16 October 2020, Spencer-Adams joined National League side Dover Athletic on loan until 31 January 2021. He made his debut the following day, starting and playing the entirety of a 2–0 defeat at Torquay United. On 25 January, Spencer-Adams returned to Watford having made 10 appearances in all competitions for the National League's bottom side.

At the end of the 2020–21 season, Spencer-Adams was released by Watford.

Leicester City 
On 15 October 2021, Spencer-Adams tweeted to say he had signed for Leicester City.

International career
Born in the London Borough of Waltham Forest, Spencer-Adams qualifies to play for Guyana through his father. In March 2021, he was named in the preliminary Guyana squad for their World Cup qualifiers later that month. He made his debut on 25 March 2021 in a World Cup qualifier against Trinidad and Tobago.

Career statistics

Club

Notes

International

References

2001 births
Living people
Footballers from the London Borough of Waltham Forest
Guyanese footballers
Guyana international footballers
English footballers
English people of Guyanese descent
Association football defenders
Arsenal F.C. players
Watford F.C. players
Dover Athletic F.C. players
National League (English football) players
Black British sportspeople